The Sleepwalker (French: Boniface somnambule) is a 1951 French comedy film directed by Maurice Labro and starring Fernandel, Andrex and Gaby André. The film was shot at the Cité Elgé studios in Paris with sets designed by the art director Paul-Louis Boutié. Is is a sequel to the 1949 film The Heroic Monsieur Boniface.

Cast 
 Fernandel as Victor Boniface 
 Andrex as Charlie, le chef des gangsters 
 Gaby André as Stella Gazzini, la vedette à Tabarin 
 André Roanne as Louis, le voleur du briquet 
 Raoul Marco as Le directeur des magasins 
 Louis de Funès as Anatole, le mari soupçonneux 
 Julien Maffre as Victor, le lampiste
 André Numès Fils as Jules, le valet de chambre du Grand Hôtel 
 Rivers Cadet as Jean 
 Michel Ardan as Un gangster 
 Mathilde Casadesus as Mademoiselle Thomas 
 Yves Deniaud as René, un gangster 
 Simone Silva as Louise
 Nadine Tallier as Ginette, une vendeuse aux magasins Berthès

References

Bibliography
 Ginette Vincendeau. Stars and Stardom in French Cinema. Bloomsbury Publishing, 2000.

External links 
 
 Boniface somnambule (1951) at the Films de France

1951 films
French comedy films
1950s French-language films
French black-and-white films
Films directed by Maurice Labro
1951 comedy films
French sequel films
1950s French films